Jimmy Williams (birth unknown – death unknown) was an English professional rugby league footballer who played in the 1920s. He played at club level for Featherstone Rovers (Heritage № 13), as a goal-kicking , i.e. number 6.

Background
Jimmy Williams was born in Featherstone, Wakefield, West Riding of Yorkshire, England.

Playing career
Williams made his début for Featherstone Rovers on Saturday 27 August 1921, and he played his last match for Featherstone Rovers during the 1928–29 season, he appears to have scored no drop-goals (or field-goals as they are currently known in Australasia), but prior to the 1974–75 season all goals, whether; conversions, penalties, or drop-goals, scored 2-points, consequently prior to this date drop-goals were often not explicitly documented, therefore '0' drop-goals may indicate drop-goals not recorded, rather than no drop-goals scored. In addition, prior to the 1949–50 season, the archaic field-goal was also still a valid means of scoring points.

Testimonial match
Williams's benefit season at Featherstone Rovers, shared with Arthur Haigh, took place during the 1928–29 season.

References

External links

Search for "Williams" at rugbyleagueproject.org

English rugby league players
Featherstone Rovers players
Place of death missing
Rugby league five-eighths
Rugby league players from Featherstone
Year of birth missing
Year of death missing